The Bornova Railway Branch was a 5.9 km long railway line, from Halkapınar to Bornova, Turkey, that branched from the SCP's main line at Halkapınar. The line was completed by the Smyrne Cassaba & Prolongements in 1866. TCDD absorbed the SCP on June 1, 1934 and took over ownership of the line. Usage decreased in the 1970s and the line was abandoned in the early 1990s. This line is now a part of the Izmir Metro.

References

External links
Trains of Turkey

Railway lines in Turkey
Closed railway lines in Turkey
Metro
Standard gauge railways in Turkey
Railway lines opened in 1866
1866 establishments in the Ottoman Empire